Anne Reid later Anne Reid Picher (born 1945) is an alpine skier from New Zealand.

In the 1968 Winter Olympics at Grenoble, she came 37th in the Downhill, 30th in the Slalom and 42nd in the Giant Slalom.

References 
 Black Gold by Ron Palenski (2008, 2004 New Zealand Sports Hall of Fame, Dunedin) p. 107

External links 
 
 

Living people
1945 births
New Zealand female alpine skiers
Olympic alpine skiers of New Zealand
Alpine skiers at the 1968 Winter Olympics